Nea Kerdylia is a village in the municipality of Amphipolis. It is located on the national road Thessaloniki - Alexandroupolis and is 50 km away from Nigrita, 70 km from Serres. The village is named after Mount Kerdylion, which is part of the Kerdylion mountain range.

See also
List of settlements in the Serres regional unit

References

Populated places in Serres (regional unit)